Forms of address used in the United Kingdom are given below.

Terminology

Abbreviations

Several terms have been abbreviated in the tables below. The forms used in the table are given first, followed by alternative acceptable abbreviations in parentheses. The punctuation of each abbreviation depends on the source. For example, the punctuation of "The Rt Hon" is not consistent throughout sources. The Gazette favours "The Rt. Hon.", while the government usually prefers "The Rt Hon" or "The Rt Hon."

His/Her Majesty: HM ( TM)
His/Her Royal Highness: HRH ( TRH)
The Most Honourable: The Most Hon (The Most Honble)
The Right Honourable: The Rt Hon (The Rt Honble)
The Honourable: The Hon (The Honble)
The Much Honoured: The Much Hon (The Much Hon'd)
The Most Reverend: The Most Rev (The Most Revd or The Most Rev'd)
The Right Reverend: The Rt Rev (The Rt Revd or The Rt Rev'd)
The Very Reverend: The Very Rev (The Very Revd or The Very Rev'd)
The Reverend: The Rev (The Revd or The Rev'd)
The Venerable: The Ven (The Venble)

"The Most Noble", which is an abbreviation of "The Most High, Potent, and Noble", is rarely used by Dukes and Duchesses; when used, the forenames of the peer or peeress can be used after "His Grace" but before "The Duke of [...]". This style is also sometimes used without "His Grace".

Names and territorial designations

"London" represents the territorial designation of any peerage.
"Edinburgh" represents any territorial designation in Scotland.
"John" and "William" represent any male name
"Jane" and "Mary" represent any female name.
"Smith" and "Brown" represent any surname, regardless of gender.

In regards to the nobility, Mary Brown represents a woman who married John Brown, while Jane Smith represents an unmarried woman.

Royalty

Nobility

The preposition of may be omitted in the form of Marquessates and Earldoms and included in the form of Scottish Viscountcies. It is not often present in peerage Baronies and Lordships of Parliament, though always present in Dukedoms and Scottish feudal Baronies.

The definite article the in the middle of two or more titles is sometimes capitalized, as in these tables. However this is controversial: traditional British guides use the lower-case the. As a single example, Debrett's gives "Major-General the Lord ...", and Pears' Cyclopaedia in the section on Modes of Address gives several examples where the definite article interior to a list of honours is lower case.

Peers and peeresses

Eldest sons of dukes, marquesses and earls

Eldest sons of dukes, marquesses and earls use their father's most senior subsidiary title as courtesy titles: note the absence of "The" before the title. If applicable, eldest sons of courtesy marquesses or courtesy earls also use a subsidiary title from their (great) grandfather, which is lower ranking than the one used by their father. Eldest daughters do not have courtesy titles; all courtesy peeresses are wives of courtesy peers.

Heirs of Scottish peers

Heirs-apparent and heirs-presumptive of Scottish peers use the titles "Master" and "Mistress"; these are substantive, not courtesy titles. If, however, the individual is the eldest son of a Duke, Marquess or Earl, then he uses the appropriate courtesy title, as noted above.

Male descendants of peers

Female descendants of peers

If a daughter of a peer or courtesy peer marries another peer or courtesy peer, she takes her husband's rank. If she marries anyone else, she keeps her rank and title, using her husband's surname instead of her maiden name.

Gentry and minor nobility

Baronets

Knights and Baronets are distinguished by the use of "Bt" (or, archaically, "Bart") after the latter's names (and by the use of the appropriate post-nominal letters if the former are members of an Order of Chivalry).

Scottish feudal barons

Knights and dames

Seigneurs of Fiefs

Chiefs, chieftains and lairds

Clergy

Church of England

Similar styles are also applied to clergy of equivalent status in other religious organisations. The words clergy and cleric/clerk are derived from the proper term for bishops, priests and deacons still used in legal documents:  (e.g. . Clergy in the Church of England are never addressed as "Revd (Surname)".

Church of Scotland
The Church of Scotland, as a Presbyterian church, recognizes state-awarded titles only as courtesy. In court (assembly, presbytery and session) a person may only be addressed as Mr, Mrs, Miss, Dr, Prof, etc. depending on academic achievement. Thus ministers are correctly addressed as, for example, Mr Smith or Mrs Smith unless they have a higher degree  or academic appointment e.g. Dr Smith or Prof. Smith. It is 'infra dig' to use the style 'Rev' and even the use of 'the Rev Mr' requires sensitivity to official style.

Judiciary

United Kingdom

England and Wales

A judge's first name only forms part of their judicial style if, at the time of their appointment, there is a senior judge with the same or a similar surname. Thus, if there is a "Mr Justice Smith", subsequent judges will be "Mr Justice John Smith", "Mrs Justice Mary Smith", etc. High Court Judges and above who are King's Counsel do not use the post-nominal letters following appointment or after retirement.

A member of the Bar (but not a solicitor) addresses a circuit judge or higher, out of court, as "Judge".

Scotland

Academics

The forms of address used for academics can, in most cases, be either formal or social.

See also
 United Kingdom order of precedence
 British nobility
 British honours system
 Peerage
 Gentry
 Post-nominal letters (UK)

Notes

References

External links
 Styles of the members of the British royal family

Titles in the United Kingdom
British culture
United Kingdom culture-related lists
United Kingdom
United Kingdom